Mercury was an Imperial Russian Navy 18-gun, two-masted warship. It is famous for its lopsided battle with two Turkish ships, which took place on May 14, 1829.

The name Pamiyat Mercuriya (literally In Memory of Mercury) was given to a number of ships of the Russian Baltic Fleet.

Battle on May 14, 1829

Summary 
Pursued by a Turkish fleet (6 ships of the line, 2 frigates, 2 corvettes), the Russian brig Mercury engaged in a lopsided battle with the ships-of-the-line Selimiye (110 guns) and Real-bei (74 guns) near the Strait of Bosphorus. After damaging the ships one by one, the brig escaped pursuit.

Crew (As of May 1829)

Officers 
 Aleksandr Ivanovich Kazarsky, Lt. Capt.
 Fyodor Mikhailovich Novosilsky, Lt.
 Dmitry Petrovich Pritupov, midshipman
 Ivan Petrovich Prokofyev, naval pilot Lt.
 Sergey Iosifovitch Skaryatin, Lt.

Seamen 
 Anisim Arekhov
 Philip Vasilyev
 Gridnev, bataler
 Afanasiy Gusev
 Seliverst Dmitriev
 Ippolit Erofeev
 Ivan Lisenko, cannoneer
 Fyodor Spiridonov, naval pilot mate
 Artamon Timofeev, cannoneer
 Anton Scherbakov, cannoneer

Damage and casualties 
As a result of the battle, the brig took 10 casualties, including 4 killed and 6 wounded. Damage to the ship included:
 22 hull breaches
 133 sail plan breaches
 16 spar breaches
 148 instances of minor rigging damage
 loss of all rowboats

By official information, neither Turkish ships lost crew as the brig's main objective during the battle was to damage their spars and rigging.

In art 

Ivan Aivazovsky created 3 paintings featuring the ship:
 Brig "Mercury" leading a battle with Two Turkish Ships / Бриг «Меркурий» ведёт бой с двумя турецкими судами
 Brig "Mercury" meets Russian Fleet after a victory over Two Turkish Ships on 15.05.1829 / Бриг «Меркурий» после победы над двумя турецкими кораблями встречается с русской эскадрой 15.05.1829, Oil-on-canvas, 123 х 190 cm. State Russian Museum, 1848
 Brig "Mercury" Attacked by Two Turkish Ships / Бриг «Меркурий», атакованный двумя турецкими кораблями, Oil-on-canvas, 212 x 339 cm, Aivazovsky Picture Gallery, Feodosia, 1892

Several other artists created notable works featuring the Mercury:
 Barri: Battle of Brig "Mercury" with Two Turkish Ships / Барри: Бой брига «Меркурий» с двумя турецкими кораблями
 Ivanov: Brig "Mercury" / Иванов: Бриг «Меркурий»
 A.N. Lubyanov: Brig "Mercury" / А. Н. Лубянов: Бриг «Меркурий»
 N.P. Krasovskiy: Battle of Brig "Mercury" with Two Turkish Ships / Н. П. Красовский: Бой брига «Меркурий» с двумя турецкими кораблями
 Mikhail Stepanovitch Tkachenko: Battle of Brig "Mercury" with Turkish Ships on May 14, 1829 / Бой брига "Меркурий" с турецкими кораблями 14 мая 1829 года, Oil-on-canvas, Central Naval Museum, St. Petersburg, 1907

Critics of the Aivazovsky painting 
The position of the ships portrayed by Aivazovsky in his work has been criticized as being historically inaccurate because of the brig's position between two significantly larger Turkish ships. Still, it's possible that Aivazovsky's artistic impression simply heightened the tension in the painting by accentuating the hopelessness of the brig's situation.

Paintings by other artists (Krasovskiy, Barri, Pechatin) of the same battle, though less known, portray a more realistic depiction of the battle.

Sources
 Draft schematics of 20-gun brig Mercury, 1819, Russia

Ships of the Imperial Russian Navy
1820 ships
Maritime incidents in May 1829
Brigs